Alcohol dehydrogenases are enzymes that catalyze the oxidation of alcohols to aldehydes or ketones.

Alcohol dehydrogenase may also refer to:

 Alcohol dehydrogenase (acceptor)
 Alcohol dehydrogenase (azurin)
 Alcohol dehydrogenase (cytochrome c)
 Alcohol dehydrogenase, iron containing 1
 Alcohol dehydrogenase (NAD(P)+)
 Alcohol dehydrogenase (NADP+)
 Alcohol dehydrogenase (nicotinoprotein)
 Alcohol dehydrogenase (quinone)

 Biology disambiguation pages